Castellet Castle (Spanish:) is a castle located in the Alt Penedès region of Spain. Built in the 10th century, the castle is designed in the Romanesque style.

History 
Castellet Castle was established in 977 during the reign of Borrell II, Count of Barcelona.

References 

Castles in Catalonia